Impact of a Legend is the third and final extended play by American rapper Eazy-E. It was released posthumously on March 26, 2002, the seventh anniversary of his death. The EP was promoted by former bandmate  Ice Cube, whom Eazy had made peace with shortly before his death in 1995. The tracks on the album were supposed to be on the Str8 off tha Streetz of Muthaphukkin Compton album.

Track listing

Personnel
Sean Williams - A&R administrator
Madeleine Smith - A&R administrator
Dave Lopez - mixing
David Weldon - producer
Tomica Wright - executive producer
Eric Wright - main artist

Samples
Eazy 1, 2, 3
"G'd Up" by Tha Eastsidaz

Switchez
"More Bounce to the Ounce" by Zapp & Roger
"Tom's Diner" by Suzanne Vega
"Make the Music With Your Mouth Biz" by Biz Markie

Ruthless Life
"Jamaica Funk" by Tom Browne 
" Nut'z On Ya Chin" by Eazy-E

No More Tears
" Shed No Tears” by G.B.M

References 

2002 EPs
G-funk EPs
Eazy-E albums
Gangsta rap EPs
Ruthless Records EPs
EPs published posthumously
Albums produced by Rhythum D